Remove the Earth is the debut full-length album by Christian metal band Advent. It was released February 12, 2008 through Solid State Records.

Track listing

Trivia 

 Last three minutes contains the song "One Crushing Blow" from their Three Track Demo

Personnel 
Advent
 Joe Musten - vocals
 Matt Harrison - Guitar
 Mike Rich - Guitar
 Johnny Smrdel - Bass
 Chris Ankelein - drums
Additional Musicians
 Ryan Clark (Demon Hunter) - Guest Vocals on track 4
Production
 Al Jacob - Producer
 Mitchell Marlow - Producer

References

External links 
  - Official Myspace
  - Official Purevolume

2008 albums
Solid State Records albums